is a Japanese professional drifting driver. He currently competes in the D1 Grand Prix series for his own team, Team Kunny'z. Alongside D1, he also competes in Formula Drift Japan events.

Complete drifting results

D1 Grand Prix

Sources
D1 Grand Prix
Takahashi's D1 Profile

Japanese racing drivers
Drifting drivers
1972 births
Living people
D1 Grand Prix drivers